El Salvador first competed in the Paralympic Games at the 2000 Summer Paralympics in Sydney, Australia. It has participated in the Summer Paralympic Games every four years since that time. El Salvador has never taken part in the Winter Paralympics, and until Tokyo 2020, no Salvadorian had won a Paralympic medal. In 2021, Herbert Aceituno became the first athlete to win a medal, earning bronze in powerlifting at the 59 kg category.

Six athletes from El Salvador have represented their nation at the Paralympic Games, five in the sport category of athletics, which is largely track and field competitions, and one in powerlifting. Wheelchair sprinter Claudia Marina Palacios, the sole Salvadorean competitor in 2000, was the first to represent El Salvador at the Paralympics. Two athletes were sent to the Paralympics in 2004, and one each to the games in 2008, 2012, and 2016.

Medal tables

Medals by Summer Games

Summer Paralympic Games

2000 Sydney 

El Salvador sent one athlete to the 2000 Summer Paralympics in Sydney, Australia, in their first appearance at the Paralympics. Wheelchair sprinter Claudia Marina Palacios competed in the women's 400 metre race in the T54 category, finishing fourth in her semifinal heat and not advancing to the final.

2004 Athens 

Two athletes were sent to represent El Salvador at the 2004 Summer Paralympics in Athens, Greece. Marleny Chauez competed in the women's 200 metre race in the T54 category, finishing fifth in her heat and not advancing to the final. William Rivas competed in the men's 100 metres (T54), finishing seventh in his first-round heat and not advancing to the semifinal round. Rivas qualified for the men's marathon (T54), but did not start the race.

2008 Beijing 

El Salvador's sole representative at the 2008 Summer Paralympics in Beijing, China, was sprinter Zulma Cruz. She competed in the women's 100 metres (T13) and 200 metres (T13). She finished sixth in her first-round heats in both events and did not advance to the finals.

2012 London 

The only Salvadorian athlete  sent to represent his nation at the 2012 Summer Paralympics in London, United Kingdom, was wheelchair sprinter Luis Hector Morales Garcia. He competed in the men's 100 metres (T54), finishing seventh in his first-round heat and not advancing to the final round.

2016 Rio 

In 2016, El Salvador once more sent one individual to represent their nation at the 2016 Summer Paralympics in Rio, Brazil. This was Herbert Aceituno who competed in the powerlifting competition, men's - 72 KG. Herbert did not medal in the competition, ultimately won by Lei Liu of China.

2020 Tokyo 

In 2021, Herbert Aceituno won the first ever medal for El Salvador at the Paralympics. He won the bronze medal in the powerlifting men's 59 kg event.

See also
 El Salvador at the Olympics

References